The 1945 Washington Senators won 87 games, lost 67, and finished in second place in the American League. They were managed by Ossie Bluege and played their home games at Griffith Stadium, where they drew 652,660 fans, fourth-most in the eight-team league. The 1945 Senators represented the 45th edition of the Major League Baseball franchise and were the last of the 20th-century Senators to place higher than fourth in the American League; the team moved to Minneapolis–Saint Paul in 1961 to become the modern Minnesota Twins.

When the regular season ended on September 30, Washington trailed the pennant-winning Detroit Tigers (88–65) by 1 games. But because of World War II travel restrictions and the need to convert Griffith Stadium's playing field to host its autumn football tenants, the NFL Washington Redskins and Georgetown University, the Senators' 1945 schedule had actually ended seven days before, on Sunday, September 23. On that day, the "Griffs" stood one full game behind 86–64 Detroit. As the idle Senators waited, the Tigers had four games to play, two each against the fifth-place Cleveland Indians and third-place St. Louis Browns. After splitting against the Indians, Detroit was rained out for three days in St. Louis. When the Tigers defeated the Browns 6–3 in the first game of the doubleheader on September 30 (on a come-from-behind, grand slam home run by Hank Greenberg), the Senators were mathematically eliminated and Detroit clinched the pennant. The second game of the twin bill was rained out.

Outstanding pitching drove the 1945 Senators' success. Washington led the American League in team earned run average (2.92). Its starting rotation featured four knuckleball artists—Roger Wolff, Dutch Leonard, Johnny Niggeling and Mickey Haefner—who combined for 60 victories. Wolff and Leonard posted sterling 2.12 and 2.13 earned run averages, third and fourth in the league.

Regular season 
 August 4, 1945: Handicapped Senators coach Bert Shepard pitched in a game against the Red Sox. Shepard had an artificial leg but managed to give up only one run in  innings while striking out two Red Sox batters.
 September 7, 1945: Washington first baseman Joe Kuhel homers off the Browns' Bob Muncrief to provide the winning margin in a 3–2 Senator victory at Griffith Stadium. It is the only four-bagger struck all season by the Senators in 78 home games in their spacious ballpark—and it was an inside-the-park job.  Opposing teams hit only six home runs themselves in 1945 at Washington's home field.

Season standings

Record vs. opponents

Roster

Player stats

Batting

Starters by position 
Note: Pos = Position; G = Games played; AB = At bats; H = Hits; Avg. = Batting average; HR = Home runs; RBI = Runs batted in

Other batters 
Note: G = Games played; AB = At bats; H = Hits; Avg. = Batting average; HR = Home runs; RBI = Runs batted in

Pitching

Starting pitchers 
Note: G = Games pitched; IP = Innings pitched; W = Wins; L = Losses; ERA = Earned run average; SO = Strikeouts

Other pitchers 
Note: G = Games pitched; IP = Innings pitched; W = Wins; L = Losses; ERA = Earned run average; SO = Strikeouts

Relief pitchers 
Note: G = Games pitched; W = Wins; L = Losses; SV = Saves; ERA = Earned run average; SO = Strikeouts

Farm system

Notes

References 
1945 Washington Senators at Baseball-Reference
1945 Washington Senators team page at www.baseball-almanac.com

Minnesota Twins seasons
Washington Senators season
Washington